Hemirhamphodon is a genus of viviparous halfbeak fish. Most recognized species are endemic to lowland forest streams, rivers and swamps in Borneo (often in areas with peat), but H. phaiosoma and H. pogonognathus are also found elsewhere in Southeast Asia. These fish are viviparous (with the exception of oviparious H. tengah) and are sometimes kept as aquarium fish, but otherwise have no commercial value.

Species
There are currently nine recognized species in this genus:
 Hemirhamphodon byssus H. H. Tan & K. K. P. Lim, 2013
 Hemirhamphodon chrysopunctatus Brembach, 1978
 Hemirhamphodon kapuasensis Collette, 1991
 Hemirhamphodon kecil H. H. Tan & K. K. P. Lim, 2013
 Hemirhamphodon kuekenthali Steindachner, 1901
 Hemirhamphodon phaiosoma (Bleeker, 1852)
 Hemirhamphodon pogonognathus (Bleeker, 1853)
 Hemirhamphodon sesamum H. H. Tan & K. K. P. Lim, 2013
 Hemirhamphodon tengah Collette, 1991

See also
 Live-bearing aquarium fish

References
 Description of the maintenance and breeding of freshwater halfbeaks.

Zenarchopteridae
Fishkeeping